Borrelia japonica is a spirochete bacterium first isolated from Japanese mammals.

References

Further reading

External links
NCBI Taxonomy Browser - Borrelia

japonica
Bacteria described in 1993